Khosa is a town of Bahawalpur District in the Punjab province of eastern Pakistan. Neighbouring settlements include Faqirwali and Basti Nari.

References

Populated places in Bahawalpur District